Mazon (məˈzɒn/) is a village in Mazon Township, Grundy County, Illinois, United States. The name derives from the Potawatomi word for "nettles" (mzan). The population was 1,015 at the 2010 census.  The center of population of Illinois is located in Mazon. Illinois' State Fossil, the unique and bizarre Tully Monster was first found in nearby Mazon Creek. Mazon was formerly served by the Santa Fe railway at the Mazon Depot. It was established in 1876.

Geography

Demographics

As of the census of 2000, there were 904 people, 344 households, and 265 families residing in the village. The racial makeup of the village was 95.58% White, 0.33% African American, 1.22% Native American, 0.11% Asian, 1.22% from other races, and 1.55% from two or more races. Hispanic or Latino of any race were 2.88% of the population.

There were 344 households, out of which 38.1% had children under the age of 18 living with them, 62.5% were married couples living together, 10.2% had a female householder with no husband present, and 22.7% were non-families. 18.3% of all households were made up of individuals, and 9.0% had someone living alone who was 65 years of age or older.  The average household size was 2.63 and the average family size was 2.99.

In the village, the population was spread out, with 26.7% under the age of 18, 9.1% from 18 to 24, 28.7% from 25 to 44, 22.0% from 45 to 64, and 13.6% who were 65 years of age or older.  The median age was 36 years. For every 100 females, there were 99.1 males.  For every 100 females age 18 and over, there were 95.0 males.

The median income for a household in the village was $55,250, and the median income for a family was $61,118. Males had a median income of $41,250 versus $22,500 for females. The per capita income for the village was $21,890.  About 3.3% of families and 3.4% of the population were below the poverty line, including 1.7% of those under age 18 and 5.4% of those age 65 or over.

Notes and references

Villages in Grundy County, Illinois
Villages in Illinois
1876 establishments in Illinois